John Nater  (born February 14, 1984) is a Canadian politician. He is currently serving as the Member of Parliament for the riding of Perth—Wellington in the House of Commons of Canada.

Education and early life
Nater was born in Logan Township (now part of the Township of West Perth), and raised on a family pig farm. While attending Carleton University, he worked as a volunteer intern for MP Gary Schellenberger, and later became his special assistant. He later became an executive assistant to MPP Randy Pettapiece. He also worked as a  grievance analyst with the Correctional Service of Canada and policy analyst at the Treasury Board of Canada.

Nater earned degrees as a Bachelor of Public Affairs and Policy Management from Carleton in 2007, as well as a Master of Public Administration from Queen's University in 2008. From 2012 to 2014, he was a lecturer at King's University College. When nominated to run for MP in November 2014, he had been a PhD candidate at Western University in political science.

Municipal politics
In the 2010 Ontario municipal election, Nater was elected to the West Perth council as a representative for the Mitchell Ward. During his time on municipal council Nater served as chair of the Environmental Services Committee. In 2014 the committee began a project to build a new water tower in Mitchell.

He did not run for re-election in the subsequent municipal election, as he planned to seek the Conservative nomination for Perth—Wellington, vacated due to the impending retirement of long-serving MP Gary Schellenberger.

Federal politics

2015 election
Nater won the nomination, and was elected in the 2015 Canadian federal election with 22,255 votes (42.9%).

42nd Canadian Parliament
From February 17, 2016, to September 18, 2017, Nater served as Vice Chair of the Canadian House of Commons Standing Committee on Official Languages. During this time he was critical of the Liberal Government's decision to nominate Madeleine Meilleur as Official Languages Commissioner. Nater frequently called the nomination partisan and questioned the Liberal Government's appointments process.

During the 42nd Canadian Parliament, Nater earned a reputation as an expert on parliamentary procedure.

On March 23, 2017, Nater made an intervention in the House of Commons on the Question of Privilege raised a day earlier by his Conservative colleagues Lisa Raitt and Maxime Bernier. Nater argued there was sufficient grounds for a prima facie question of privilege. On April 6, Speaker Geoff Regan ruled there was. However, during debate on the motion following the ruling the Liberal MP Alexandra Mendès moved a motion to proceed to orders of the day, ending the debate and with it the opportunity to address a violation of Members' rights.

On April 7, 2017, Nater made another intervention asking the Speaker to revive the previous motion. Citing extensively from previous speakers rulings and the rules of parliamentary procedure Nater argued that the Government's motion to move to orders of the day during a debate on a motion of privilege "is an extremely dangerous precedent that denies members their fundamental right to vote" 

On April 11, 2017, Regan ruled in favour of Nater and invited him to once again move a motion to refer the issue to the Canadian House of Commons Standing Committee on Procedure and House Affairs.

On August 30, 2017, Official Opposition leader Andrew Scheer named Nater to be Shadow Minister for Interprovincial Trade and the Sharing Economy.

On September 19, 2017, Nater became a member of the Standing Committee on Procedure and House Affairs.

On January 28, 2019, Nater introduced a bill to amend the Criminal Code of Canada. Inspired by a criminal incident in Stratford, the intention of the bill was to better protect young people and people with disabilities from sexual exploitation.

2019 election
In the 2019 Canadian federal election Nater was re-elected with 25,622 votes, finishing more than 10,000 votes ahead of the second-placed Liberal candidate.

43rd Canadian Parliament
From November 28, 2019, to September 2, 2020, Nater served as Deputy House Leader of the Official Opposition under leaders Andrew Scheer and Erin O'Toole.

On September 8, 2020, O'Toole named Nater to be Shadow Minister for Rural Economic Development. During this time Nater was actively critical of the Liberal record on rural internet service.

2021 election
Nater won his second re-election campaign in the 2021 Canadian federal election, again increasing his share of the vote.

44th Canadian Parliament
On November 9, 2021, Nater was named Shadow Minister for Canadian Heritage. During this time Nater was critical of the Liberal Government's Online Streaming Act. Nater was also involved in the Heritage Committee work on the Hockey Canada sexual assault scandal.

During the 2022 Conservative Party of Canada leadership election, Nater endorsed Jean Charest, former premier of Quebec and cabinet minister during the premierships of Brian Mulroney and Kim Campbell, and was among four Conservative MPs to sign an open letter asking Charest to run. In the contest Charest came second to Pierre Poilievre. On October 12, 2022, when Poilievre named his new shadow cabinet, Nater was not included.

Electoral record

Further reading

Academic

References

External links

 
 
 
 , drawing from 

1984 births
Living people
Conservative Party of Canada MPs
Members of the House of Commons of Canada from Ontario
Ontario municipal councillors
University of Western Ontario alumni
Academic staff of the University of Western Ontario
Queen's University at Kingston alumni
21st-century Canadian politicians